Sinan Akdag (born November 5, 1989) is a German professional ice hockey defenceman. He is currently playing for Adler Mannheim in the Deutsche Eishockey Liga (DEL).

Playing career 
A Rosenheim native, Akdag came through the youth ranks of the Starbulls Rosenheim. After joining the Krefeld Pinguine organization, he made his debut in Germany's top-flight Deutsche Eishockey Liga (DEL) during the 2007-08 campaign. Following a seven-year stint with the Krefeld team, he signed with fellow DEL side Adler Mannheim in 2014 and won the German championship in his first year with the team.

He received DEL Defenseman of the Year honors in the 2015–16 season.

International play
After representing Germany at the U17, U18 and U20 level, he made his debut on the men's national team in December 2011. Akdag was nominated to be part of Team Germany during the 2018 Olympic Games in Pyeongchang, South Korea.

Career statistics

Regular season and playoffs

International

Awards and honours

References

External links

1989 births
Living people
Adler Mannheim players
German people of Turkish descent
German ice hockey defencemen
Krefeld Pinguine players
EV Landshut players
Ice hockey players at the 2018 Winter Olympics
Medalists at the 2018 Winter Olympics
Olympic ice hockey players of Germany
Olympic medalists in ice hockey
Olympic silver medalists for Germany
People from Rosenheim
Sportspeople from Upper Bavaria